Melchior the Apothecary is a 2022 Estonian historical mystery film. It is the first instalment of the Melchior trilogy, based on the novels by Indrek Hargla. The film focuses on apothecary Melchior Wakenstede, who solves crimes in medieval Tallinn. The film is directed by Elmo Nüganen.

Background
The film was set to premiere in October 2021, but was delayed to April 2022 due to the COVID-19 pandemic.

The second part of the trilogy is scheduled to be released in August, and the third in October, making it the first time in Estonia film history where an entire trilogy will premiere within a single calendar year.

Filming locations in Tallinn included St. Catherine's Monastery, Danish King's Garden, Town Hall Square and Pikk Jalg street. Some scenes were also filmed in Kuressaare Castle.

The film is one of the most successful in Estonian cinema history with cinema admissions of 125,500 by 31 August 2022. It is one of only 11 Estonian films to receive over 100,000 cinema admissions since Estonia restored independence. The film received a limited release in Vantaa, Finland, with producer Veiko Esken citing the response as positive and planning to screen the sequels in Vantaa, as well.

Cast
Märten Metsaviir as Melchior Wakenstede
Alo Kõrve as Wentzel Dorn
Maarja Johanna Mägi as Keterlyn Kordt
Siim Kelner as Clingenstain
Ken Rüütel as Hinric the Monk
Marko Matvere as Spanheim
Martin Kork as Martin
Mait Malmsten as Rode
Kristjan Sarv as Rinus
Andero Ermel as Freisinck
Franz Malmsten as Kilian
Henessi Schmidt as Hedwig
Hendrik Toompere Jr. as Casendrope
Jaan Pehk as Ditmar
Gatis Gaga as Ludeke
Liis Maria Kaabel as Valge Akrobaat
Loora-Eliise Kaarelson as Girl at Courtroom
Amanda Hermiine Künnapas as Servant Girl

References

External links 
 

2022 films
Estonian drama films
Films directed by Elmo Nüganen
Historical mystery films
2022 drama films
2020s mystery films
Films set in Tallinn
Films shot in Estonia